Vladimir is a masculine given name of Slavic origin, widespread throughout all Slavic nations in different forms and spellings. The earliest record of a person with the name is knyaz Vladimir of Bulgaria.

Etymology
The Old East Slavic form of the name is Володимѣръ Volodiměr, while the Old Church Slavonic form is Vladiměr. According to Max Vasmer, the name is composed of Slavic владь vladĭ "to rule" and *mēri "great", "famous" (related to Gothic element mērs, -mir, c.f. Theodemir, Valamir). The modern (pre-1918) Russian forms Владимиръ and Владиміръ are based on the Church Slavonic one, with the replacement of мѣръ by миръ or міръ resulting from a folk etymological association with миръ "peace" or міръ "world".

After the Bolshevik reform of Russian spelling in 1918, Владиміръ became Владимир, meaning the etymology of the name changed from міръ (universe, world) to миръ / мир after 1918 (peace).

Its Germanic form, Waldemar, consists of the elements wald- meaning "power", "brightness" and -mar meaning "fame". Thus, the name Waldemar / Vladimir almost exactly shares the same meaning with the name Robert.

History
The earliest known record of this name was the name of Vladimir-Rasate (died 893), ruler of Bulgaria. Vladimir-Rasate was the second Bulgarian ruler following the Christianization of Bulgaria and the introduction of Old Bulgarian as the language of church and state. The name of his pre-Christian dynastic predecessor, khan Malamir (r. 831–836), sometimes claimed as the first Bulgarian ruler with a Slavic name, already exhibits the (presumably Gothic) -mir suffix.

The early occurrence of the name in the East Slavic culture comes with Volodimer Sviatoslavich (Old East Slavic: Володимѣръ Свѧтославичь, "Vladimir the Great"), first Grand Prince of Kiev (r. 980–1015). According to historian Donald Ostrowski, Russians tend to prefer "Vladimir", while Ukrainians tend to prefer "Volodimer". However, "Volodimir" (similar to "Volodymyr") tends to occur as much in the primary sources as "Volodimer", and significantly more often than "Vladimir".

Three successors of Vladimir the Great shared his given name: Vladimir II Monomakh (1053–1125), Vladimir III Mstislavich (1132–1173) and Vladimir IV Rurikovich (1187–1239). The town Volodymyr in north-western Ukraine was founded by Vladimir and is named after him. The foundation of another town, Vladimir in Russia, is usually attributed to Vladimir II Monomakh. However some researchers argue that it was also founded by Vladimir the Great. The veneration of Vladimir the Great as a saint of the Russian Orthodox Church gave rise to the replacement of the East Slavic form of his name with the Old Church Slavonic (Old Bulgarian) one. The immense importance of Vladimir the Great as national and religious founder resulted in Vladimir becoming one of the most frequently-given Russian names.

Variants
The Slavic name survives in two traditions, the Old Church Slavonic one using the vocalism Vladi- and the Old East Slavic one in the vocalism Volodi-.

The Old Church Slavonic form Vladimir (Владимир) is used in Russian, Bulgarian, Serbian, and Macedonian, borrowed into Slovenian, Croatian Vladimir, Czech and Slovak Vladimír.

The polnoglasie "-olo-" of Old East Slavic form Volodiměr (Володимѣръ) persists in the Ukrainian form Volodymyr (Володимир), borrowed into Slovak Volodymýr.

Historical diminutive forms: Vladimirko (Russian), Volodymyrko (Ukrainian).

In Belarusian the name is spelled Uladzimir (Uładzimir, Уладзімір) or Uladzimier (Uładzimier, Уладзімер).

In Polish, the name is spelled Włodzimierz.

In Russian, shortened and endeared versions of the name are Volodya (and variants with diminutive suffixes: Volod'ka, Volodyen'ka, etc.), Vova (and diminutives: Vovka, Vovochka, etc.), Vovchik, Vovan. In West and South Slavic countries, other short versions are used: e.g., Vlade, Vlado, Vlada, Vladica, Vladko, Vlatko, Vlajko, Vladan, Władek, Wlodik and Włodek.

The Germanic form, Waldemar or Woldemar derived from the elements Wald (power, brightness) and Mar (famous), is sometimes traced to Valdemar I of Denmark (1131–1182) named after his Russian maternal grandfather, Vladimir II Monomakh. The Germanic name is reflected in Latvian Voldemārs and Finnic (Finnish and Estonian) Voldemar.

The Greek form is Vladimiros (Βλαδίμηρος). The name is most common in Northern Greece especially among the Slavic speakers of Greek Macedonia. Diminutives of the name among these Slavic speakers are Vlade and Mire.

People with the name

Royalty
 Vladimir of Bulgaria, (r.889–893), Knyaz of Bulgaria
 Vladimir the Great, (958–1015), prince of Novgorod, grand Prince of Kiev, and ruler of Kievan Rus'
 Grand Duke Vladimir Alexandrovich of Russia (1847–1909)
 Vladimir Kirillovich, Grand Duke of Russia (1917–1992)
 Jovan Vladimir, (990–1016), prince of Duklja
 Vladimir II Monomakh, (1053–1125), Grand Prince of Kievan Rus', prince of Kiev; also ruled in Rostov and Suzdal
Vladimir the Bold (1353–1410), prince of Serpukhov, one of the principal commanders of Lithuanian–Muscovite War (1368–1372) and Battle of Kulikovo

Religious figures
Vladimir Bogoyavlensky (1848–1918), bishop of the Russian Orthodox Church, Metropolitan of Moscow and Kolomna between 1898 and 1912, Metropolitan of St. Petersburg and Ladoga between 1912 and 1915, and Metropolitan of Kiev and Gallich between 1915 and 1918
Vladimir Gundyayev, known as Patriarch Kirill of Moscow (born 1946), Russian Orthodox bishop, Patriarch of Moscow and all Rus' and Primate of the Russian Orthodox Church
Vladimir Sabodan (1935–2014), head of the Ukrainian Orthodox Church (Moscow Patriarchate) (UOC-MP) from 1992 to 2014

Presidents and prime ministers
 Vladimer "Lado" Gurgenidze (born 1970), Georgian career banker, business executive, and former politician, sixth Prime Minister of Georgia.
 Vladimir Ivashko (1932-1994), Soviet Ukrainian politician, General Secretary of the Communist Party of the Soviet Union and Chairman of the Supreme Soviet of the Ukrainian Soviet Socialist Republic
 Vladimir Kokovtsov (1853–1943), Russian politician who served as the prime minister of Russia from 1911 to 1914
 Vladimir Lenin (1870–1924), Russian revolutionary, head of government of Russian Soviet Federative Socialist Republic, founder and first leader of Soviet Union.
 Vladimír Mečiar (born 1942), Slovak politician who served as the prime minister of Slovakia three times, from 1990 to 1991, from 1992 to 1994 and from 1994 to 1998
 Vladimir Pashkov (born 1961), Prime Minister of the Donetsk People's Republic (DPR).
 Vladimir Putin (born 1952), current president of Russia and former prime minister.
 Volodymyr Shcherbytsky (1918-1990), Ukrainian Soviet politician, First Secretary of the Communist Party of the Ukrainian Soviet Socialist Republic from 1972 to 1989
 Vladimir Špidla (born 1951), Czech politician who served as the prime minister of the Czech Republic
 Vladimir Vasilyev (born 1949), Russian politician and Head of the Republic of Dagestan.
Vladimir Voronin (born 1941), president of Moldova.
 Volodymyr Zelenskyy (born 1978), Ukrainian former comedian and actor, politician, current President of Ukraine.

Military leaders
Vladimir Vazov (1868 – 1945) Bulgarian general in the Balkan Wars and First World War
Vladimir Stoychev (1892 – 1990) Bulgarian general in the Second World War
Vladimir Zaimov (1888 – 1942) Bulgarian general who acted as a Soviet spy in the Kingdom of Bulgaria. He was made Hero of the Soviet Union for his actions.
Vladimir Antonov-Ovseenko (1883–1938), Ukrainian Bolshevik leader and diplomat, one of the principal commanders of October Revolution, Ukraine Offensive (1919) and Allied intervention in the Russian Civil War
Vladimir Arshba (1958-2018), Abkhaz soldier and politician who served as the first Minister of Defence of the Republic of Abkhazia, an unrecognised state, from 1992 until 1993, one of the principal commanders of War in Abkhazia (1992-1993)
Vladimir Baer (1853-1905), Russian captain of the Russo-Japanese War
Vladimir Boldyrev (born 1949), Commander-in-Chief of the Russian Ground Forces, one of the principal commanders of Second Chechen War, Russo–Georgian War and Insurgency in the North Caucasus
Vladimir Chirkin (born 1955), Russian military officer and a former commander of Russian Ground Forces, one of the principal commanders of Insurgency in the North Caucasus
Vladimir Constantinescu (1895–1965), Romanian general in World War II, one of the principal commanders of Battle of the Caucasus
Vladimir Cukavac (1884-1965), Serbian general holding the title of army general in the Royal Yugoslav Army, one of the principal commanders of Invasion of Yugoslavia
Vladimir Dobrovolsky (1834-1877), Russian general of the Russo-Turkish War (1877–1878)
Vladimir Gelfand, Soviet soldier in World War II who became known for his published war time diaries
Vladimir Gittis (1881–1938), Soviet military commander and komkor, one of the principal commanders of Battle for the Donbas (1919) and Latvian War of Independence 
Volodymyr Kedrowsky (1890–1970), political activist, diplomat, writer, and a colonel in the army of the Ukrainian People's Republic 
Vladimir Kondić (1863-1940), Serbian general of World War I
Vladimir Kotlinsky (1894–1915), Russian Second Lieutenant of World War I
Vladimir Lazarević (born 1949), Serbian general and convicted war criminal, one of the principal commanders of Kosovo War
Vladimir Lobov (born 1935), former Soviet and Russian military commander, Chief of the General Staff of the Soviet Armed Forces in 1991, General of the Army, Doctor of Military Sciences and People's Deputy of the USSR from 1989 to 1991
Vladimir Marushevsky (1874-1951), Imperial Russian general, last chief of staff of the Russian Republic
Vladimir May-Mayevsky (1867-1920), general in the Imperial Russian Army, one of the principal commanders of Battle for the Donbas (1919)
Vladimir Mikhaylov (1943), Russian general, former commander-in-chief of the Russian Air Force
Vladimir Miklukha (1853–1905), Russian captain of the Russo-Japanese War
Vladimir Shamanov (born 1957), retired Colonel General of the Russian Armed Forces, who was Commander-in-Chief of the Russian Airborne Troops (VDV), one of the principal commanders of First Chechen War, First Nagorno-Karabakh War and Russo–Georgian War, the leading perpetrator of Alkhan-Yurt massacre
 Vladimir Sukhomlinov (1848–1926) Russian general of the Imperial Russian Army who served as the Chief of the General Staff from 1908 to 1909 and the Minister of War from 1909 to 1915
 Vladimir Triandafillov (1894-1931), Soviet military commander and theoretician considered by many to be the "father of Soviet operational art"
 Vladimir Tributs (1900-1977), Soviet naval commander and admiral, one of the principal commanders of Eastern Front (World War II) 
 Vladimir Vol'skii (1877–1937), Russian revolutionary, one of the principal commanders of Russian Civil War
 Vladimir Zhoga (1993 - 2022), Russian-Ukrainian separatist who was the commander of the Sparta Battalion, a pro-Russian separatist force, one of the principal commanders of Second Battle of Donetsk Airport, Siege of Sloviansk, Battle of Volnovakha and Eastern Ukraine offensive

Intelligence officers
Vladimir Dekanozov (1898–1953), Soviet senior state security operative and diplomat, deputy chief of GUGB
Vladimir Kolokoltsev (born 1961), Russian politician and police officer, General of the police, Moscow Police Commissioner and Russian Minister of Internal Affairs
Vladimir Kvachkov, Russian former Spetsnaz colonel and military intelligence officer, known for being arrested and charged for the attempted assassination
Vladimir Pozner Sr. (1908-1975), Russian-Jewish émigré to the United States who spied for Soviet intelligence while employed by the US government
Vladimir Semichastny (1924–2001), Soviet politician, who served as chairman of the KGB

Cosmonauts
Vladimir Aksyonov (born 1935), former Soviet cosmonaut
Vladimir Dezhurov (born 1962), Russian former cosmonaut
Vladimir Dzhanibekov (born 1942), former cosmonaut
Vladimir Komarov (1927–1967), Soviet test pilot, aerospace engineer, and cosmonaut, commander of Voskhod 1, the first spaceflight to carry more than one crew member, solo pilot of Soyuz 1 and the first human to die in a space flight
Vladimir Kovalyonok (born 1942), retired Soviet cosmonaut
Vladimir Lyakhov (1941–2018), Ukrainian Soviet cosmonaut
Vladimír Remek (born 1948), Czech politician and diplomat and former cosmonaut and military pilot
Vladimir Shatalov (1927–2021), Soviet cosmonaut
Vladimir Solovyov (born 1946), former Soviet cosmonaut
Vladimir G. Titov (born 1947), retired Russian Air Force Colonel and former cosmonaut
Vladimir Vasyutin (1952–2002), Soviet cosmonaut

Musicians
Vladimir Ashkenazy (born 1937), internationally recognized solo pianist, chamber music performer and conductor
Vladimir Horowitz (1903–1989), Russian-American classical pianist and composer
Vladimir A. Komarov (born 1976), Russian musician, singer, songwriter, sound producer, DJ, and journalist
Vladimir de Pachmann, Russian-German pianist 
Vladimir Rosing (1890–1963), Russian-born American and English operatic tenor and stage director 
Vladimir Vysotsky (1938–1980), Soviet singer-songwriter, poet, and actor
Vladimir Djambazov (born 1954), Bulgarian composer and horn player

Actors and TV hosts
 Vladimir Duthiers (born 1969), American journalist and TV host at CBS
 Vladimir Fogel, Russian actor of the silent film era
 Vladimir Mashkov (born 1963), Russian actor and film director
 Vladimir Solovyov (born 1963), Russian journalist, television presenter, writer and propagandist
 Vladimir Yeryomin, Soviet and Russian actor, screenwriter and producer, member of the Union of Theatre Workers of the Russian Federation
 Vladimir Karamazov (born 1979), Bulgarian actor, producer and photographer

Politicians
Vladimir Chirskov (born 1935), Soviet politician
Vladimir Dedijer, Yugoslav partisan fighter during World War II who became known as a politician, human rights activist, and historian, representative of Yugoslavia at the United Nations
Volodymyr Horbulin (born 1939), Ukrainian politician, Head of the Council for Foreign and Security Policy, former secretary of the National Security and Defense Council of Ukraine, former Head of the National Space Agency of Ukraine
Vladimír Hučín (born 1952), Czech political celebrity and dissident of both communist and post-communist era
Vladimir Kara-Murza (born 1981), Russian opposition politician, journalist, author, and filmmaker
Vladimir Konstantinov, Crimean and Russian politician serving as Chairman of the State Council of the Republic of Crimea, one of the principal commanders of Annexation of Crimea by the Russian Federation
Vladimir Korolenko, Ukrainian-born Russian writer, journalist, human rights activist and humanitarian of Ukrainian and Polish origin
Vladimir Makei, Belarusian politician who has served as the minister of foreign affairs of Belarus since 2012
Vladimir Medinsky (born 1970), Russian political figure, academic and publicist who served as the Minister of Culture of Russia from May 2012 to January 2020
Vladimir Milov (born 1972), Russian opposition, economist, associate of Alexei Navalny
Vladimir D. Nabokov (1870–1922), Russian criminologist, journalist, and progressive statesman
Volodymyr Ohryzko (born 1956), Ukrainian diplomat, Minister of Foreign Affairs of Ukraine from December 18, 2007, to March 3, 2009
 Vladimir Plahotniuc (born 1966), Moldovan politician, businessman and philanthropist, chairman of the Democratic Party of Moldova
 Vladimir Terebilov (1916–2004), Soviet judge and politician
Vladimir Veselica, Croatian politician and economist
Vladimir Vladimirov, Russian politician, Governor of Stavropol Krai
Volodymyr Vynnychenko (1880–1951), Ukrainian statesman, political activist, writer, playwright, artist, who served as the first Prime Minister of Ukraine
Vladimir A. Yakovlev (born 1944), Russian politician and former governor of Saint Petersburg
Vladimir Yakushev (born 1968), Russian politician serving as the Presidential Plenipotentiary Representative in the Ural Federal District
Vladimir Yelagin (born 1955), Russian politician

Literary figures
Vladimir Duthiers (born 1969), American journalist
Vladimir Mayakovsky (1893–1930), Soviet poet, playwright, artist, and actor
Vladimir Menshov (1939-2021), Soviet and Russian actor and filmmaker
Vladimir Nabokov (1899–1977), Russian and American novelist, poet, translator and entomologist
Vladimir Oravsky (born 1947), Swedish author and film director
Volodymyr Sosiura (1898–1965) Ukrainian lyric poet, writer.
Vladimir Sorokin (born 1955), Russian writer and dramatist

Scientists
Vladimir Shkodrov (1930 – 2010) Bulgarian astronomer and professor at the Bulgarian Academy of Sciences
Vladimir Derevenko, Russian Empire and Soviet medical doctor and surgeon who served at the court of Emperor Nicholas II of Russia
Vladimir Hachinski, Canadian clinical neuroscientist and researcher
Vladimir L. Komarov (1869–1945), Russian botanist
Vladimir Kostitsyn (born 1945), Russian geophysicist
Vladimir Kovalevsky, Russian statesman, scientist and entrepreneur
Vladimir Vernadsky (1863 – 1945), Russian mineralogist and geochemist
Vladimir K. Zworykin, Russian-American inventor, engineer, and pioneer of television technology

Artists
Vladimir Makovsky (1846–1920), Russian painter, art collector, and teacher
Vladimir Dimitrov (1882 – 1960), Bulgarian painter, draughtsman and teacher

Businessmen
Vladimir Potanin (born 1961), Russian business oligarch
Vladimir Tenev (born 1987), Bulgarian-American entrepreneur and billionaire

Sportsmen
Vladimir Arabadzhiev (born 1984), Bulgarian racing driver
Wladimir Balentien (born 1984), Curaçaoan-Dutch baseball player
Vladimír Coufal (born 1992), Czech footballer
Vladimir Dubov, Bulgarian freestyle wrestler 
Vladimir Guerrero (born 1975), Dominican baseball player
Vladimir Guerrero Jr. (born 1999), Canadian-Dominican baseball player
Wladimir Klitschko (born 1976), Ukrainian boxer
Vladimir Konstantinov (born 1967), Russian-American ice hockey player
Vladimir Kozlov (born 1979), Ukrainian-American producer and wrestler
Vladimir Kramnik (born 1975), Russian chess grandmaster
Vladimir Lutchenko, retired ice hockey player who played in the Soviet Hockey League
Vladimir Moragrega (born 1998), Mexican footballer
Vladimir Obuchov (1935–2020), Soviet basketball coach
Vladimir Orlando Cardoso de Araújo Filho (born 1989), Brazilian footballer
Vladimir Popov (weightlifter) (born 1977), Moldovan weightlifter
Vladimir Proskurin (1945–2020), Russian footballer
Vladimir Salkov (1937–2020), Russian footballer
Vladimir Sotnikov (born 2004), Russian Paralympic swimmer
Vladimir Stojković, Serbian professional footballer
Volodymyr Sydorenko (born 1976) Ukrainian former professional boxer
Vladimir Tarasenko (born 1991), Russian ice hockey player
Vladimir Petkov (born 1971), Bulgarian chess grandmaster
Vladimir Iliev (born 1987), Bulgarian biathlete
Vladimir Gadzhev (born 1987), Bulgarian footballer
Vladimir Nikolov (born 1977), Bulgarian volleyball player

Others
Vladimir Socor (born 1945), Romanian-American political analyst of East European affairs for the Jamestown Foundation and its Eurasia Daily Monitor

See also
 
Slavic names
Waldemar (disambiguation)
Walter (name)
Vladislav

References

External links

Slavic masculine given names
Russian masculine given names
Belarusian masculine given names
Bosnian masculine given names
Bulgarian masculine given names
Croatian masculine given names
Czech masculine given names
Macedonian masculine given names
Montenegrin masculine given names
Romanian masculine given names
Serbian masculine given names
Slovak masculine given names
Slovene masculine given names
Ukrainian masculine given names